Roland "Roli" Nagy (born 12 June 1971) is a Romanian former professional footballer who played as a midfielder for teams such as: UTA Arad, FC Brașov, Steaua București, Mainz 05, FSV Frankfurt or Darmstadt 98. After retirement Roli Nagy started his football manager career being on several occasions the manager of UTA Arad, but he also managed teams such as Național Sebiș or Gloria Lunca-Teuz Cermei. He is currently the technical director of Viitorul Arad, a football academy from Arad.

References

External links
 
 

1971 births
Living people
Sportspeople from Arad, Romania
Romanian footballers
Association football midfielders
Liga I players
Liga II players
FC UTA Arad players
FC Brașov (1936) players
FC Steaua București players
2. Bundesliga players
1. FSV Mainz 05 players
FSV Frankfurt players
SV Darmstadt 98 players
Romanian expatriate footballers
Romanian expatriate sportspeople in Germany
Expatriate footballers in Germany
Romanian football managers
FC UTA Arad managers
CS Național Sebiș managers